Zenrin-ji (禅林寺) is the name of a number of Japanese Buddhist temples.

Eikan-dō Zenrin-ji, in Sakyō-ku, Kyoto
Zenrin-ji (Ichinomiya), Ōbaku Zen temple in Ichinomiya, Aichi Prefecture
Zenrin-ji (Fukui), a Sōtō temple in Fukui, Fukui Prefecture
Zenrin-ji (Gifu), in Gifu, Gifu Prefecture
Zenrin-ji (Nagasaki), a Rinzai temple in Nagasaki
Zenrin-ji (Kunisaki), in Kunisaki, Ōita Prefecture
Zenrin-ji (Mitaka), in Mitaka, Tokyo where graves of Mori Ōgai and Osamu Dazai situated
Zenrin-ji (Hamura), a Rinzai temple in Hamura, Tokyo
Zenrin-ji (Kainan), a Shingon temple in Kainan, Wakayama Prefecture
Zenrin-ji (Taiwan), a Rinzai temple in Chiayi County, Taiwan